Harakah is a newspaper founded in 1987 and published by Malaysian Islamic Party (PAS). In addition to using the Malay language, the paper includes an 8-page English language pullout consisting of pages and columns written in English called the English Section. A page in Jawi writing was introduced in 2007. Articles from Harakah are also available through its own website, Harakahdaily.net.

Overview 
The circulation of Harakah broke new heights during the post-Anwar sacking by Mahathir in the late 1990s. This has caused printing permit, which for years had allowed publication twice a week, to be changed to twice a month by the Barisan Nasional-dominated government of Malaysia.

Harakah'''s current Managing Director is Khairil Nizam Khirudin. Currently helmed by Wan Nordin Wan Yaakob who was appointed its editor-in-chief in 2015, its former editor-in-chiefs include Zulkifli Sulong, Suhaimi Taib and Ahmad Lutfi Othman. Its internet wing edition, Harakahdaily.net, is headed by Mohd Rashidi Hassan. One of the better known contributors to Harakah'' was M. G. G. Pillai, who coined the term "Darul Casino". He died in 2006.

During the 52nd PAS Youth Muktamar which was held in November 2012, Nasrudin Hassan of PAS Youth demanded that the editorial line-up of the newspaper should be restructured and wants a committee to be set up to censor the editorial content of the newspaper and its online portal Harakahdaily. PAS Youth claims that the newspaper has lost its credibility and derailed from its own purpose. Nasrudin claims that it no longer carries the aspiration of the jamaah to propel the Islamic movement of the 21st century. PAS later accepted the resolution without debate.

References

External links 
 

1987 establishments in Malaysia
English-language newspapers published in Asia
Malay-language newspapers
Newspapers published in Malaysia
Bilingual newspapers
Newspapers established in 1987